Maila Nisula (born 18 March 1931) is a Finnish former gymnast. She competed in seven events at the 1952 Summer Olympics.

References

External links
 

1931 births
Possibly living people
Finnish female artistic gymnasts
Olympic gymnasts of Finland
Gymnasts at the 1952 Summer Olympics
Sportspeople from Vyborg
20th-century Finnish women